Benjamin Keene  (1753–1837) was a British barrister and member of parliament who sat in the House of Commons from 1776 to 1784.

Early life
Keene was the eldest son of Rt. Rev. Edmund Keene, Bishop of Ely, and his wife Mary Andrews, daughter. of Lancelot Andrews of Edmonton. His uncle, Sir Benjamin Keene, MP  was ambassador to Madrid.  Keene was educated at Eton College from  1762 to 1770 and was admitted at Gray's Inn in 1767 and at Peterhouse, Cambridge on 6 October 1770. In 1774 he  was awarded MA at Cambridge.  He married Mary Ruck, daughter of George Ruck of Swyncombe, Oxfordshire on 18 March 1780, and succeeded his father in  July 1780.

Political career
Keene was elected as Member of Parliament for Cambridge at a by-election on 7 November 1776. He was re-elected for Cambridge at the 1780 general election. In 1784 he was a member of the St. Alban's Tavern group who tried to bring Fox and Pitt together. He did not stand in  1784 .

Later life and legacy
Keene was High Sheriff of Cambridgeshire and Huntingdonshire in 1804. He died on 21 November 1837. By his marriage to Mary Ruck he had two sons, Benjamin, an Army officer, and Charles Edmund, a clergyman of the Church of England. He also had three daughters, Frances, Sophie-Elizabeth, and Mary-Anne, who married Sir William Blackett, 5th Baronet. Admiral William Ruck-Keene (1867–1935) was one of his great-grandsons.

References

1753 births
1837 deaths
Alumni of Peterhouse, Cambridge
Members of Gray's Inn
Members of the Parliament of Great Britain for English constituencies
British MPs 1774–1780
British MPs 1780–1784
High Sheriffs of Cambridgeshire and Huntingdonshire
People educated at Eton College
English barristers